The College of Engineering and Physical-Mathematic Sciences of the National Polytechnic Institute is a highly recognized institute of higher education in Mexico. The College was proposed in 1932 by Secretary of Public Education Narciso Bassols and was founded by integrating the already existent School of Mechanical and Electrical Sciences that dates back to the 19th century. Currently, the College is divided into six schools.

Superior School of Computer Sciences
ESCOM "Escuela Superior de Cómputo"

Superior School of Physics and Mathematics
ESFM"Escuela Superior de Física y Matemáticas"

Superior School of Engineering and Architecture
ESIA Unidad Tecamachalco "Escuela Superior de Ingeniería y Arquitectura"  
ESIA Unidad Ticomán "Escuela Superior de Ingeniería y Arquitectura"  
ESIA Unidad Zacatenco "Escuela Superior de Ingeniería y Arquitectura"

Superior School of Mechanical and Electrical Engineering
ESIME Unidad Azcapotzalco "Escuela Superior de Ingeniería Mecánica y Eléctrica "
ESIME Unidad Culhuacán "Escuela Superior de Ingeniería Mecánica y Eléctrica "  
ESIME Unidad Ticomán "Escuela Superior de Ingeniería Mecánica y Eléctrica "  
ESIME Unidad Zacatenco "Escuela Superior de Ingeniería Mecánica y Eléctrica "

Superior School of Chemical Engineering
ESIQIE "Escuela Superior de Ingeniería Química E Industrias Extractivas"

Superior School of Textile Engineering
ESIT "Escuela Superior de Ingeniería Textil"

References

Instituto Politécnico Nacional